Teenage Mutant Ninja Turtles: Out of the Shadows is a 2016 American superhero film directed by Dave Green and written by Josh Appelbaum and André Nemec. It is the sequel to Teenage Mutant Ninja Turtles (2014), and the second and final installment in the Teenage Mutant Ninja Turtles reboot series. The film stars Megan Fox, Will Arnett, Laura Linney, Stephen Amell, Noel Fisher, Jeremy Howard, Pete Ploszek, Alan Ritchson, Tyler Perry, Gary Anthony Williams, Brian Tee, and Sheamus. The film follows the Ninja Turtles who, after defeating the Shredder,  must face an even bigger foe: the dreaded Krang.

Principal photography on the film began on April 27, 2015, in New York City. It was released on June 3, 2016, by Paramount Pictures. The film received generally mixed reviews from critics, with some deeming it a slight improvement over its predecessor. However, it was not financially successful and grossed only $245 million against a $135 million budget, resulting in a planned third film being scrapped. A reboot is being planned.

Plot
One year after stopping Shredder,  the Teenage Mutant Ninja Turtles are informed by April O'Neil that scientist Baxter Stockman is working for Shredder and plans to bust him out of prison. As the Shredder is transferred between prisons alongside Bebop and Rocksteady by corrections officer Casey Jones, the Foot Clan attack their convoy. Despite the turtles' interference, Shredder escapes when Stockman uses a teleportation device. Shredder is hijacked mid-teleport, winds up in another dimension, and meets the alien warlord Krang, who reveals his plans to invade Earth. He gives Shredder a mutagenic compound in exchange for finding three components of a machine that Krang sent to Earth long ago which will open a portal to his dimension when united, as Shredder and Stockman have the first piece. Casey tells NYPD chief Rebecca Vincent what happened to Shredder, but is met with disbelief, and decides to go on his own.

Shredder recruits Bebop and Rocksteady, and Stockman uses Krang's mutagen to transform them into a humanoid warthog and rhinoceros, respectively. April witnesses their transformation and steals the remaining mutagen vial from the TCRI lab. Pursued by the Foot, she is rescued by Casey, who later meets the turtles, but the vial is taken into police custody. In the lair, Donatello deduces that the mutagen could be used to turn the turtles into humans, but Leonardo refuses and orders Donatello to keep it a secret from the others. However, Michelangelo overhears and tells Raphael, which enrages Raphael and leads to a fierce argument between him and Leo. Raphael then recruits Mikey, April, Casey, and Vern Fenwick to break into the NYPD headquarters and retrieve the mutagen, but the Foot arrive ahead of them. In the ensuing battle, the turtles' existence is revealed to the police, who start a manhunt for them, and April and Casey are arrested while helping the brothers escape with the mutagen.

After recovering the second component of the machine, Bebop and Rocksteady go to the rainforests of Manaus, Brazil, for the final component. The turtles follow them and board Bebop and Rocksteady's jet in midair. In the resulting battle, the jet is critically damaged after Rocksteady fires a tank-mounted Mark 19 grenade launcher, and crashes into a river, though Bebop and Rocksteady are ultimately able to escape with the component. Shredder and Stockman complete the device and open a portal to Krang's dimension through which his war machine, the Technodrome, begins to emerge. Shredder betrays Stockman and his men take him to their headquarters in Tokyo. When entering the Technodrome, Krang likewise betrays Shredder, freezing him and locking him with his collection of other defeated foes.

Unable to reach the Technodrome as the police pursue them, the turtles debate over taking the mutagen to become human and fight openly. While Leonardo agrees, Raph shatters the vial. Upon April's request, Vern recovers the security footage from a hidden TCRI camera that proves Stockman and the Shredder's collaboration and secures April and Casey's release. April arranges a meeting between the turtles and Vincent, and convinces her that they are not enemies. With the help of the police, the turtles are able to jump from the Chrysler Building and confront Krang aboard the still-assembling Technodrome. Krang is defeated when Donatello short circuits his robotic body. April, Casey and Vern raid the Foot Clan facility, defeat Bebop, Rocksteady and the Shredder's lieutenant Karai and take control of the device. The turtles are able to hurl the ship's beacon back through the portal, taking Krang and the rest of the Technodrome with it, as April, Casey, and Vern shut the portal down.

Bebop and Rocksteady are back in custody, while Stockman remains at large. The turtles are honored by Vincent and the NYPD along with April, Casey, and Vern. Vincent offers to introduce the turtles to the public, but the turtles opt to keep their existence a secret while still helping as they always have. On top of the Statue of Liberty, the turtles celebrate their victory over the vanquished Krang.

Cast

Voice actors and motion-capture
 Pete Ploszek as Leo: The leader of the turtles who wields a pair of katana in battle. For the first time, Ploszek also voices the character, who had previously been voiced by Johnny Knoxville in the first film.
 Alan Ritchson as Raph: The hot-headed brother who wields a pair of sai in battle.
 Jeremy Howard as Donnie: The intelligent brother known for his scientific and technological expertise who builds equipment and machinery for the turtles and who wields a bo-staff in battle.
 Noel Fisher as Mikey: The light-hearted brother known for his pranks and jokes and who wields a pair of nunchucks in battle.
 Peter D. Badalamenti (motion-capture) and Tony Shalhoub (voice) as Splinter: The adoptive father and sensei of the turtles. His motion-capture was previously performed by Danny Woodburn in the first film.
 Gary Anthony Williams as Bebop: A criminal partner of Rocksteady who was genetically mutated into an anthropomorphic warthog.
 Sheamus as Rocksteady: A criminal partner of Bebop who was genetically mutated into an anthropomorphic rhinoceros.
 Brad Garrett as Krang: A ruthless extraterrestrial life-form equipped with a robotic prototype body, who seeks to destroy Earth and enslave the universe.

Live action
 Megan Fox as April O'Neil: A reporter for Channel 6 News who had befriended the turtles in the previous film, who now helps them fight the released Shredder and his allies.
 Stephen Amell as Casey Jones: A corrections officer turned vigilante who wears a hockey-mask and wields a hockey stick as a weapon. He eventually meets and befriends the turtles and April.
 Will Arnett as Vern "The Falcon" Fenwick: April's cameraman and friend who is revealed to have taken credit for the turtles' actions in saving New York City. He assists the turtles in stopping Shredder once again.
 Laura Linney as Police Chief Rebecca Vincent: the chief of NYPD who initially detests but later allies with the turtles in saving New York City.
 Brian Tee as The Shredder: The leader of the Foot Clan who now seeks revenge on the turtles and allies with Krang. He was previously portrayed by Tohoru Masamune in the first film.
 Tyler Perry as Dr. Baxter Stockman: A mad scientist and former worker at Sacks Industries who allies with Shredder in the latter's aims to take over New York City. He was previously portrayed by K. Todd Freeman in the first film.
 Brittany Ishibashi as Karai: Shredder's second in-command. She was previously portrayed by Minae Noji in the first film.

Dean Winters appears as a bartender. Supermodel Alessandra Ambrosio has a cameo appearance. NBA players Carmelo Anthony, DeAndre Jordan, Lou Amundson, JJ Redick, Austin Rivers, Matt Barnes, and Spencer Hawes also made cameos in the film. Series co-creator Kevin Eastman makes a cameo appearance as a pizza delivery man named after himself in the film's opening. Jill Martin also made a cameo appearance in the basketball scene in the film. Judith Hoag, who previously played April O'Neil in the 1990 film, appeared in a cameo as Rita, April's boss, in a deleted scene. Jane Wu plays Jade, a police officer.

Production

Development
After the 2014 film exceeded box office expectations, Paramount and Nickelodeon officially announced a sequel was greenlit, and set to be released in theatres on June 3, 2016, with plans to incorporate the characters Casey Jones and Bebop and Rocksteady. Jonathan Liebesman and Bradley Fuller were also interested in doing a storyline that involved Dimension X and Krang. Earth to Echo director Dave Green helmed the sequel, replacing Jonathan Liebesman. Known briefly as Teenage Mutant Ninja Turtles: Half Shell, Paramount revealed that the title had officially been changed to Teenage Mutant Ninja Turtles: Out of the Shadows.

Casting
Megan Fox and Will Arnett returned as April O'Neil and Vern Fenwick respectively; also confirmed were the Shredder's return, and Bebop and Rocksteady debut in the movie. In an interview, William Fichtner stated that he would be returning as Eric Sacks, but for unknown reasons, he ultimately did not appear in the final film. However, he could have returned for the third installment, considering he (along with the turtle actors, Noel Fisher, Jeremy Howard, Alan Ritchson and Pete Ploszek) signed on for three TMNT films at the time. Production was confirmed to start in April 2015, along with the casting of Alessandra Ambrosio, and several members of the Los Angeles Clippers. Stephen Amell was cast as Casey Jones, after test reading alongside several different actors. Amell acknowledged the character bore similarities to his Oliver Queen from Arrow. He stated the characters are "fundamentally different" from one another, but that Casey did resemble Oliver from older versions. Tyler Perry was cast as scientist Baxter Stockman, replacing K. Todd Freeman, who played the role in the 2014 film. Brian Tee joined the cast as the Shredder, replacing Tohoru Masamune from the first film. Laura Linney was cast in an unspecified role. Gary Anthony Williams was cast as Bebop, while WWE wrestler Sheamus was confirmed to play Rocksteady. Minae Noji was replaced with Brittany Ishibashi in the role of Karai. CM Punk revealed that he lost the role of Rocksteady to Sheamus. Fred Armisen was originally chosen to voice Krang in the film, but, in May 2016, shortly before the film's release, Brad Garrett voiced Krang instead due to Armisen having schedule conflicts. While promoting Elvis & Nixon, Johnny Knoxville revealed that he was not asked to return for the sequel as the voice of Leonardo.

Filming
Filming began in April in New York City and Buffalo, New York, spending about $70 million in the state. Filming began on April 27, 2015, when the film crew was spotted filming in Midtown Manhattan and moved out to Foz do Iguaçu, Brazil, with filming in Buffalo beginning on May 4, along the Kensington Expressway and ended May 17. Filming wrapped up in August 2015. Additional filming occurred in New York City on January 30 following year, and ended on February 1. Farrelly and Williams recorded additional dialogue for the film in February 2016.

Music

Steve Jablonsky composed the music score, replacing Brian Tyler from the first film. Mexican teen boy band CD9 performed an updated version of the original show's theme song for the film. The film score soundtrack was released on June 3, 2016, on digital platforms but excluded compact discs.

Release

Theatrical
The film premiered in New York City on May 22, 2016, and was released in the United Kingdom on May 30 and the United States on June 3.

Home media
Out of the Shadows was released on Digital HD on September 6, 2016, and on 4K Ultra HD, Blu-ray, Blu-ray 3D and DVD on September 20. The film debuted in first place on the overall home video sales chart and in second place on the Blu-ray sales chart for the week ending on September 25.

Reception

Box office
Out of the Shadows grossed $82.1 million in the United States and Canada and $163.6 million in other territories for a worldwide total of $245.6 million, against its production budget of $135 million. It made around 50% less than its predecessor, which had grossed $493 million. In October 2016, in response to the film's poor commercial performance, producers Andrew Form and Brad Fuller said they loved the movie, and they loved making it, but they were surprised by the film's performance and "it just didn't find an audience. We really don't know why" The Hollywood Reporter estimated the film lost the studio at least $75 million, when factoring together all expenses and revenues.

In the U.S. and Canada, the film was projected to gross around $30–40 million from 4,071 theaters in its opening weekend, with some estimates going as high as $49 million. It received a one-week special run across 331 IMAX and IMAX 3D theaters from June 2 up to June 9. The film made $2 million from Thursday night previews which began at 5 p.m., compared to the first film's $4.6 million. On its opening day it earned $12.5 million (including previews), with $4.4 million (36%) coming from 3D showings. In its opening weekend, it grossed $35.3 million, finishing first at the box office. However, its opening was down 45% from the first film's $65.6 million debut. Paramount vice chairman Rob Moore said that while the studio was hoping for a stronger opening, he believed that the film could make up some ground in the coming weeks since most films aimed at younger audiences play at better multiples.

Outside North America, the film was released in about 30 overseas IMAX markets, beginning Wednesday, June 1, with additional markets throughout the summer, including China on July 2. It opened across 40 markets the same weekend as its U.S. release, including big markets like the United Kingdom, Mexico and Russia, which is about 39% of its total international marketplace, and was projected to make around $36 million. It ended up grossing $33 million, which is down 11% when compared to the first film's same suite of markets, and had No. 1 debuts in 21 markets out of the 40. The top openings were in China ($26.1 million), the UK ($5.1 million), Russia ($4.8 million) and Mexico ($4.5 million).  In the United Kingdom, it came in second place – behind Warcraft – with a £3.49 million ($5 million) seven-day opening from 513 theaters.

In China the film was granted a rare July release date, along with The Legend of Tarzan, where it grossed an estimated $26.1 million from 6,600 screens in two days. It had a limited opening on Friday, July 1 and opened wide the following day. It faced competition from local film Bounty Hunters which had the advantage of opening wide right from Friday. Yet, Out of the Shadows emerged victorious at the end of the weekend ahead of the latter's $18 million opening. As a result, Out of the Shadows became the ninth consecutive Hollywood import film to debut atop the chart beginning from May 6, 2016. In comparable to Saturday releases, the figure is almost double the launch of Big Hero 6; 41% above the first film; and 18% higher than The Angry Birds Movie. It fell precipitously in its second weekend by 74%, earning $6.6 million and thereby slipped in to fourth place. It opened in key markets such as Germany and Austria on August 11 as well as Japan on August 26, 2016.

Critical response
The site's critical consensus reads: "Teenage Mutant Ninja Turtles: Out of the Shadows is a slight improvement over its predecessor, but still lacks the wit or anarchic energy of the comics that birthed the franchise." On Metacritic, the film has a weighted average score of 40 out of 100, based on 30 critics, indicating "mixed or average reviews". Audiences polled by CinemaScore gave the film an average grade of "A−" on an A+ to F scale, an improvement over the first film's "B".

Glenn Kenny of The New York Times gave the film a positive review writing: "This movie is, it happens, easier to sit through than the 2014 film", while also adding that "the 3-D action, overseen by the director Dave Green, is not wholly incoherent. The production values (showcasing new mutants and many gear-heavy extra-dimensional machines undreamed of in any actual engineering philosophy) are ultrashiny. And there are even a couple of amusing, albeit unmemorable, sight gags and one-liners". Edward Douglas of New York Daily News gave the film three out of five stars: "As with the best popcorn flicks, Out of the Shadows offers plenty of mindless entertainment and mind-numbing silliness that somehow works well enough to leave even the Ninja Turtles' biggest detractors shell-shocked". Michael O'Sullivan of The Washington Post praised the film's action sequences and story while overall writing that, "Out of the Shadows is, at least, deliciously silly, even if it is also decidedly forgettable. Like a well-plated but nutrition-free meal, it registers on the senses while being bad for you".

Peter Hartlaub of San Francisco Chronicle gave the film a negative review: "Your 11-year-old is going to love this film. Then he'll grow up and wonder what he was thinking". Sara Stewart of The New York Post gave the film two out of four stars and wrote, "despite the title, the wisecracking turtles named for Renaissance painters are never allowed to shine... It's a bummer, dude". Lindsey Bahr of the Associated Press gave the film one star out of four and said, "Teenage Mutant Ninja Turtles: Out of the Shadows is a Saturday morning cartoon on Michael Bay steroids. For the under 12 set, that's fine. For the rest of us? It's something to actively avoid".

Accolades

Future

Cancelled sequel
Noel Fisher stated in an interview that he and the other Turtle actors had signed on for three films. Megan Fox had also signed on for three films. Tyler Perry said that if a third film was made, his character, Baxter Stockman, would probably mutate into his fly form during the movie. Pete Ploszek also expressed his interests in reprising his role in a third film as Leonardo. In October 2016, in light of the film's mixed reception and financial underperformance, producer Andrew Form indicated that a third film was unlikely.

Animated film

In June 2020, it was reported that Nickelodeon Animation Studio was developing a computer-animated Teenage Mutant Ninja Turtles film for Paramount Pictures. Seth Rogen, Evan Goldberg, and James Weaver would produce the film through their company, Point Grey Pictures. Jeff Rowe was set to direct the film, with Brendan O'Brien writing the screenplay. It is scheduled for release on August 4, 2023.

Live-action reboot
In June 2018, Paramount Pictures announced a new reboot in the series with Bay, Fuller and Form returning to produce the film and Andrew Dodge writing the script. Fuller and Form said at the 24th Critics' Choice Awards that production on the reboot was set to start in 2019, but in July, co-creator Kevin Eastman revealed that the film was still in development and believed that Paramount took the reactions to the 2014 and 2016 films "to heart", and that "its going to be a next-level type of stuff".

In August 2021, it was announced that a new live-action film was in the works with Colin Jost and Casey Jost penning the script and Michael Bay, Andrew Form, Brad Fuller, Scott Mednick and Galen Walker signing on as producers.

References

External links

 
 
 

2016 films
2010s English-language films
2010s American films
Paramount Pictures films
Nickelodeon Movies films
Platinum Dunes films
2016 3D films
2016 action comedy films
2016 science fiction action films
2010s science fiction comedy films
2010s superhero comedy films
Alien invasions in films
American 3D films
American action adventure films
American action comedy films
American science fantasy films
American science fiction action films
American science fiction comedy films
American sequel films
Films about the New York City Police Department
Fictional portrayals of the New York City Police Department
American films about revenge
Films set in Brazil
Films set in New York City
Films set on airplanes
Films shot in Buffalo, New York
Films shot in New York City
Live-action films based on comics
IMAX films
Ninja films
Films using motion capture
Out of the Shadows
Teenage Mutant Ninja Turtles (2014 film series)
Films scored by Steve Jablonsky
Films directed by Dave Green
Films produced by Michael Bay
Films produced by Andrew Form
Films produced by Bradley Fuller
Films with screenplays by Josh Appelbaum and André Nemec
Teleportation in films
2016 martial arts films
2010s teen films
Teen superhero films